The Réunionese Football League is the governing body of association football in Réunion. It is not a FIFA member and only an associate member of the Confederation of African Football since 1992. It organizes matches for the Réunion national football team and for the domestic clubs.

References

External links
 Official website

Réunion
Football in Réunion
Reu
Football in Africa not associated with FIFA